'''Banica may refer to:

Places

Bulgaria 
 Banitsa, Vratsa Province, Bulgaria

Dominican Republic 
 Bánica, Dominican Republic

Greece 
 Banitsa (ruins), the former village where Gotse Delchev was killed
 Symvoli, in the Serres regional unit, Macedonia
 Vevi, in Florina regional unit, Macedonia

North Macedonia 
 Banica, North Macedonia

Philippines 
 Banica, a district of Roxas City
 Banica, a river of the Philippines on Panay Island
 Banica, a river of the Philippines on Negros Island flowing through Dumaguete

Poland 
 Banica, Gmina Sękowa, Lesser Poland Voivodeship
 Banica, Gmina Uście Gorlickie, Lesser Poland Voivodeship

Romania 
 Banica, the Hungarian name for Bănița Commune, Hunedoara County, Romania

Other uses
 Bănică, a Romanian surname
 Banitsa, a pastry from the Balkans
 Banovac, a Croatian coin used between 1235 and 1384
 One hundredth of an Independent State of Croatia kuna from 1941 to 1945

See also
 Banitsa (disambiguation)
 Banjica (disambiguation)